Janez Aljančič (born 29 July 1982 in Ljubljana) is a retired Slovenian football defender.

Honours

Olimpija
Slovenian Cup: 2002–03

Domžale
Slovenian PrvaLiga: 2006–07, 2007–08
Supercup: 2007

Maribor
Slovenian Cup: 2009–10

References

External links

Player profile at PrvaLiga 
Player profile at NZS 

Living people
1982 births
Footballers from Ljubljana
Slovenian footballers
Association football defenders
NK Triglav Kranj players
NK Olimpija Ljubljana (1945–2005) players
NK Ljubljana players
NK Domžale players
NK Maribor players
Slovenian PrvaLiga players
Slovenia international footballers